This is a list of diplomatic missions of Guinea-Bissau. The Republic of Guinea-Bissau follows a nonaligned foreign policy and seeks friendly and cooperative relations with a wide variety of states and organizations, although its actual diplomatic presence is small.

Honorary consulates are not included in this listing.

Current missions

Africa

Americas

Asia

Europe

Multilateral organizations

Gallery

Closed missions

Americas

Asia

Europe

See also
Foreign relations of Guinea-Bissau
List of diplomatic missions in Guinea-Bissau
Visa policy of Guinea-Bissau

References

External links
Official government website of Guinea-Bissau

 
Guinea-Bissau
Diplomatic missions of